Admiral George Edgcumbe, 1st Earl of Mount Edgcumbe, PC (3 March 1720 – 4 February 1795) was a British peer, naval officer and politician.

Early life
Edgcumbe was the second surviving son of Richard Edgcumbe, 1st Baron Edgcumbe and his wife Matilda, the only child of Sir Henry Furnese. He is thought to have been educated at Eton.

Career
In 1739, Edgcumbe was commissioned a lieutenant in the Royal Navy and in 1742 was promoted to be commander of the bomb vessel . In the course of 1743, he was appointed acting captain of the 20-gun , and was officially confirmed on 19 August 1744. He commanded her in the Mediterranean until 1745, when he was advanced to the 50-gun . This ship, as part of the Western Fleet under Edward Hawke and Edward Boscawen, initially patrolled the Bay of Biscay during the War of the Austrian Succession. Her ship's surgeon was James Lind, who conducted his experiments on scurvy during such a patrol in 1747. The war ended in 1748. About this time Edgcumbe was painted by Sir Joshua Reynolds and the Salisbury appears in the background.

He was still in her and with his small squadron at Menorca, when the French invaded the island on 19 April 1756. He hastily landed the marines and as many of the seamen as could be spared, and sailed the next day for Gibraltar before the French had taken any measures to block the harbour. At Gibraltar, he was joined by Admiral John Byng, by whom he was ordered to move into the 66-gun . In the Battle of Minorca, on 20 May the Lancaster was one of the ships in the van, under Rear-Admiral Temple West, which did get into action, and being unsupported suffered severely. In 1758, still in the Lancaster, he was in the fleet under Edward Boscawen at the reduction of Louisbourg. On his return to England, with the despatches announcing this success, he was appointed to the 74-gun , in which he took part in the blockade of Brest during the long summer of 1759, and in the crowning Battle of Quiberon Bay on 20 November 1759.

He continued in the Hero, attached to the grand fleet under Hawke or Boscawen, until the death of his brother Richard on 10 May 1761, when he inherited his brother's barony, and succeeded him to Mount Edgcumbe House and as Lord Lieutenant of Cornwall.  He was promoted to Rear Admiral on 21 October 1762 and Admiral in 1778.

Political career
In 1746, Edgcumbe was returned as Member of Parliament for Fowey at a by-election, on his father's interest. He was considered a government Whig, but rarely attended Parliament as he was at sea. In 1747, he was appointed Clerk of the Council of the Duchy of Lancaster, an office he retained until 1762.

He was appointed Treasurer of the Household in 1765, serving until 1766, and made a Privy Councillor on 26 July. He became Commander-in-Chief, Plymouth the same year, retaining the command until 1771. In 1770, he was promoted vice-admiral and was appointed joint Vice-Treasurer of Ireland. He remained Vice-Treasurer until 1772, when he was appointed Captain of the Gentlemen Pensioners and remained Captain of the Honourable Band of Gentlemen Pensioners until resigning in 1782, when he was appointed Vice-Admiral of Cornwall. In 1784, he was again appointed joint Vice-Treasurer of Ireland, holding office until 1793.

He was created Viscount Mount Edgcumbe and Valletort in 1781 and, in 1784, he was also elected a fellow of the Royal Society. In 1789, he was granted the further title of Earl of Mount Edgcumbe.

Personal life
On 16 August 1761, he had married Emma Gilbert, the only daughter of John Gilbert, Archbishop of York, and a first cousin of Robert Sherard, 4th Earl of Harborough. and they had one child:

 Richard Edgcumbe, 2nd Earl of Mount Edgcumbe (1764–1839), who married Lady Sophia Hobart, daughter of John Hobart, 2nd Earl of Buckinghamshire.

Lord Mount Edgcumbe died on 4 February 1795 and his only son, Richard, succeeded to his titles.

Descendants
Through his only son Richard, he was a grandfather of Lady Emma Edgcumbe (wife of John Cust, 1st Earl Brownlow), Lady Caroline Edgcumbe (wife of Ranald George Macdonald, 20th of Clanranald), William Edgcumbe, Viscount Valletort, Ernest Edgcumbe, 3rd Earl of Mount Edgcumbe, and George Edgcumbe.

Legacy
In English folklore, Emma has been identified as the subject of the story of the "Lady with the Ring". Lady Emma's Cottage on the Mount Edgcumbe estate is named after her.

A manuscript journal, kept by Edgcumbe and Captain William Marsh, from 30 April 1742 to 1 June 1744, is in the Bodleian Library. A letter from Edgcumbe to Garrick is printed in the latter's 'Private Correspondence'.

The town of Edgecomb, Maine was named for George Edgcumbe due to his support of the colonists during the American Revolution.

References

Attribution

|-

|-

|-

|-

|-

1720 births
1795 deaths
Edgcumbe, George
Edgcumbe, George
Edgcumbe, George
Edgcumbe, George
1
Lord-Lieutenants of Cornwall
Edgcumbe, George
Members of the Privy Council of Great Britain
Royal Navy admirals
Edgcumbe, George
Younger sons of barons
People from Maker, Cornwall
Treasurers of the Household
Honourable Corps of Gentlemen at Arms
Fellows of the Royal Society
Royal Navy personnel of the War of the Austrian Succession
Royal Navy personnel of the Seven Years' War
Members of the Parliament of Great Britain for constituencies in Cornwall